The 1977 Sam Houston State Bearkats football team represented Sam Houston State University as a member of the Lone Star Conference (LSC) during the 1977 NAIA Division I football season. Led by fourth-year head coach Billy Tidwell, the Bearkats compiled an overall record of 1–10 with a mark of 1–6 in conference play, and finished seventh in the LSC.

Schedule

References

Sam Houston State
Sam Houston Bearkats football seasons
Sam Houston State Bearkats football